Lawrence Adjei-Okyere (born 23 March 1979) is a Ghanaian former footballer who played as a midfielder.

Career

Adjei started his footballing career at Obuasi Goldfields. He scored the only goal for Goldfields in the first-leg of the 1997 CAF Champions League Final.

He joined Russian team Spartak Moscow in the summer of 2001. In January 2002, he moved to Arminia Bielefeld in Germany

In 2005, he won the 2004 CAF Confederation Cup with Accra Hearts of Oak
 He played in the 2005 CAF Super Cup, but was sent off.

He played in India from January to June 2008 with Sporting Clube de Goa, and scored his first goal for them against East Bengal Club on 6 January 2008. He then moved to Central African Republic team Sporting Club de Bangui.

References

External links

1979 births
Living people
Ghanaian footballers
Footballers from Accra
Association football midfielders
Ashanti Gold SC players
Asante Kotoko S.C. players
FC Spartak Moscow players
Arminia Bielefeld players
Accra Hearts of Oak S.C. players
Sporting Clube de Goa players
Ghana Premier League players
Russian Premier League players
2. Bundesliga players
China League One players
I-League players
Ghana international footballers
Ghanaian expatriate footballers
Ghanaian expatriate sportspeople in China
Ghanaian expatriate sportspeople in Russia
Ghanaian expatriate sportspeople in Germany
Ghanaian expatriate sportspeople in India
Ghanaian expatriate sportspeople in the Central African Republic
Expatriate footballers in China
Expatriate footballers in Russia
Expatriate footballers in Germany
Expatriate footballers in India
Expatriate footballers in the Central African Republic